Pdns or PDNS may refer to:

 PowerDNS, a DNS server
 Porcine dermatitis nephropathy syndrome, a circovirus associated disease
 Protective DNS, see

See also
 pdnsd, a caching DNS proxy server
 PDN (disambiguation)